Hilton J. Rosemarin (June 16, 1952 – May 8, 2011) was a Canadian set decorator.

Career 
Rosemarin was born in Montreal, Quebec on June 16, 1952 to Samson and Anne Rosemarin. He studied technical theatre at Ryerson Polytechnical Institute in Toronto, Ontario. His first film as a set decorator was on 1975's Sudden Fury. His first major Hollywood film was Raw Deal starring Arnold Schwarzenegger. His work was awarded with a Set Decorators Society of America Career Achievement Award.

Illness and death 
Rosemarin died of brain cancer on May 8, 2011 at his home in Toronto. He is survived by his wife Phillipa and two daughters.

References

External links 

1958 births
2011 deaths
Canadian scenic designers
Canadian set decorators
Deaths from brain tumor
People from Montreal
Toronto Metropolitan University alumni
Set decorators